Dave Hewitt (born 1961) is editor of The Angry Corrie, a hillwalking magazine. He is editor in chief of TACit Press, author of Walking the Watershed, his account of the first continuous walking of the Scottish watershed, editor of A Bit of Grit on Haystacks, a celebration of the life of Alfred Wainwright, and editor of the Sport and Outdoor sections of the online Scottish newspaper Caledonian Mercury.

He contributes to the ongoing debates surrounding access to the wild land of Scotland, bagging of hills, conservation issues etc. via radio, the print media and The Angry Corrie. Hewitt finished his round of Munros on The Saddle on 22 July 2007, accompanied by about 50 friends. This was also his 1000th Munro. He has a keen interest in cricket and politics, and is also a competitive chess player, known in Scottish chess for his love of the Trompowsky Attack and his high-risk attack-minded style.

On 25 July 2017 he was on 1712 Munros and 1239 Ben Cleuchs (3755 for the nine Ochil Donald Tops combined). He has now completed the Wainwrights.

On 28 July 2021 he completed his ascent 1500 of Ben Cleuch.

References

External links
 Some of Hewitt's columns for Scotland Online
The Angry Corrie magazine archive
TACit Press
Hewitt's articles for the Caledonian Mercury

1961 births
Living people
Scottish non-fiction writers